San Uk Ka is a village in Tai Po District, Hong Kong.

Administration
San Uk Ka is one of the villages represented within the Tai Po Rural Committee. For electoral purposes, San Uk Ka is part of the Tai Po Kau constituency, which is currently represented by Patrick Mo Ka-chun.

San Uk Ka is a recognized village under the New Territories Small House Policy.

Access
San Uk Ka is crossed by the Wilson Trail Stage 8, along Wun Yiu Road.

References

External links

 Delineation of area of existing village San Uk Ka (Tai Po) for election of resident representative (2019 to 2022)
 Antiquities Advisory Board. Historic Building Appraisal. Wong U Hing Tong, San Uk Ka, Tai Po Picture

Villages in Tai Po District, Hong Kong